is an interchange passenger railway station located in the city of  Takaishi, Osaka Prefecture, Japan, operated by the private railway operator Nankai Electric Railway. It has the station number "NK16".

Lines

Layout
The station consists of one elevated island platform and one side platform with the station building underneath.

Platforms

Adjacent stations

History
Hagoromo Station opened on 1 May 1912.

Passenger statistics
In fiscal 2019, the station was used by an average of 22,112 passengers daily.

Surrounding area
 Hamadera Park
Hagoromo University of International Studies
Hagoromo Gakuen Junior and Senior High School
Osaka Aviation College

See also
 List of railway stations in Japan

References

External links

  

Railway stations in Japan opened in 1912
Railway stations in Osaka Prefecture
Takaishi, Osaka